Sin Sang-sik (born 12 October 1941) is a South Korean wrestler. He competed at the 1964 Summer Olympics and the 1968 Summer Olympics.

References

External links
 

1941 births
Living people
South Korean male sport wrestlers
Olympic wrestlers of South Korea
Wrestlers at the 1964 Summer Olympics
Wrestlers at the 1968 Summer Olympics
Sport wrestlers from Seoul
20th-century South Korean people
21st-century South Korean people